Small Faces were an English rock band from London, founded in 1965. The group originally consisted of Steve Marriott, Ronnie Lane, Kenney Jones and Jimmy Winston, with Ian McLagan replacing Winston as the band's keyboardist in 1966. The band was one of the most acclaimed and influential mod groups of the 1960s, recording hit songs such as "Itchycoo Park", "Lazy Sunday", "All or Nothing" and "Tin Soldier", as well as their concept album Ogdens' Nut Gone Flake. They evolved into one of the UK's most successful psychedelic bands until 1969.

When Marriott left to form Humble Pie, the remaining three members collaborated with Ronnie Wood, Ronnie's older brother Art Wood, Rod Stewart and Kim Gardner, briefly continuing under the name Quiet Melon, and then, with the departure of Art Wood and Gardner, as Faces. In North America, Faces' debut album was credited to Small Faces.

Following the breakup of both Faces and Humble Pie in 1975, the classic line-up of Small Faces re-formed (consisting of Marriott, Lane, McLagan and Jones) after a re-release of "Itchycoo Park" became a top-ten hit. Lane left shortly thereafter, and was replaced by Rick Wills (later of Foreigner). This line-up (dubbed Mk-II by Marriott) recorded one album Playmates before recruiting Jimmy McCulloch. This five-piece line-up released only 78 in the Shade before breaking up.

Small Faces have been considered one of the early inspirations forand even an early root ofthe later Britpop movement. They were inducted into the Rock and Roll Hall of Fame in 2012.

History

Origins (1965)

Meeting of Lane and Marriott (1965) 
Lane and Marriott met in 1965 while Marriott was working at the J60 Music Bar in Manor Park, London. Lane came in with his father Stan to buy a bass guitar, struck up a conversation with Marriott, bought the bass and went back to Marriott's house after work to listen to records. They recruited friends Kenney Jones and Jimmy Winston who switched from guitar to the organ. They rapidly progressed from rehearsals at The Ruskin Arms public house (which was owned by Winston's parents) in Manor Park, London, to ramshackle pub gigs, to semi-professional club dates. The group chose the name, Small Faces, because of the members' small physical stature and a "Face" was somebody special; more than just a snappy dresser, he was someone in Mod circles as a leader, someone to look up to. A Face had the sharpest clothes, the best records and always was seen with the prettiest girl on his arm."

Early stage performances (1965) 
The band's early song set included R&B/soul classics such as "Jump Back", James Brown's "Please Please Please", Smokey Robinson's "You've Really Got a Hold on Me" and Ben E. King's "Stand by Me". The band also performed two Marriott/Lane original compositions, a fast and loud "Come on Children" and the "speed enhanced" song "E too D", in which Marriott would display his considerable vocal abilities in the style of his heroes and role models, Otis Redding and Bobby Bland. "E too D", which appears on their first album, Small Faces, is named after the guitar chord structure. On US compilation albums the track is titled "Running Wild". Marriott's unique and powerful voice attracted rising attention. Singer Elkie Brooks was struck by Marriott's vocal prowess and stage presence, and recommended them to a local club owner, Maurice King. Impressed, King began finding them work in London and beyond. Their first out-of-London concert was at a working men's club in Sheffield. Since the crowd was mainly made up of Teddy boys and hard-drinking workers, the band were paid off after three songs. Despondent, they walked into the mod-orientated King Mojo Club nearby (then owned by Peter Stringfellow) and offered to perform for free. They played a set that left the local mods wanting more. During a crucial residency at Leicester Square's Cavern Club, they were supported by Sonny & Cher, who were living in London at the time.

The Decca years (1965–67)

Signing to Decca and first two singles (1965)

The band signed a management contract with management impresario Don Arden, and they were in turn signed to Decca Records for recording. They released a string of high-energy mod/soul singles on the label. Their debut single was in 1965 with "Whatcha Gonna Do About It", a Top 20 UK singles chart hit. Marriott and Lane are credited with creating the instrumental to the song, "borrowing" the guitar riff from the Solomon Burke record "Everybody Needs Somebody to Love". The lyrics were co-written by Drifters band member Ian Samwell (who wrote one of the first British rock'n'roll records, "Move It") and Brian Potter.

The group failed to capitalise on the success of their first single with the follow-up which was written by Marriott/Lane, the hard-edged mod number "I've Got Mine". The band appeared as themselves in a 1965 crime film titled Dateline Diamonds starring Kenneth Cope as the band's manager and it featured the band playing their second single release. Arden thought the band's song would receive publicity from the film; however, the film's UK release was delayed, and "I've Got Mine" subsequently failed to chart despite receiving good reviews.

Shortly thereafter, Jimmy Winston left the band for an acting and music solo career. He went on to succeed as an actor in TV, film and became a successful business man. In a 2000 interview, Kenney Jones said the reason Winston was fired from the band was because "He (Winston) got above his station and tried to compete with Steve Marriott." Winston subsequently said he left the group over conflicts between Arden and Winston's brother.

Small Faces and further hit singles (1966) 

Winston was replaced by Ian McLagan, whose keyboard talents and diminutive stature fit with the groove of the band perfectly. McLagan played his first performance with the band on 2 November 1965.
The new Small Faces line-up hit the charts with their third single, "Sha-La-La-La-Lee", released on 28 January 1966. It was written for the group by Mort Shuman (who wrote many of Elvis Presley's biggest singles, including "Viva Las Vegas") and popular English entertainer and singer Kenny Lynch. The song was a big hit in Britain, peaking at number three in the UK singles chart. Their first album, Small Faces, released on 6 May 1966, was also a considerable success. They rapidly rose in popularity with each chart success, becoming regulars on British pop TV shows such as Ready Steady Go! and Top of the Pops, and toured incessantly in the UK and Europe. Their popularity peaked in August 1966, when "All or Nothing", their fifth single, hit the top of the UK charts. According to Marriott's mother Kay, he is said to have written the song about his breakup with his ex-fiancée Susan Oliver. On the success of "All or Nothing" they were set to tour America with the Lovin' Spoonful and the Mamas & the Papas; however, these plans had to be shelved by Don Arden after details of Ian McLagan's recent drug conviction were leaked.

By 1966, despite being one of the highest-grossing live acts in the country and scoring many successful singles, including four UK Top 10 chart hits, the group still had little money. After a confrontation with Arden who tried to face down the boys' parents by claiming that the whole band were using drugs, they broke with both Arden and Decca.

Immediate Label years (1967–68)

"Here Come the Nice" and their eponymous second album (1967) 

They were almost straight away offered a deal with the newly established Immediate label, formed by ex-Rolling Stones manager Andrew Loog Oldham. Given a virtual open account at Olympic Studios in Barnes, London, the band progressed rapidly, working closely with engineer Glyn Johns. Their first Immediate single was the daring "Here Come the Nice", which was clearly influenced by their drug use, and managed to escape censorship despite the fact that it openly referred to the dealer who sold drugs. A second self-titled album, Small Faces, followed, which, if not a major seller, was very highly regarded by other musicians and would exert a strong influence on a number of bands both at home and abroad.

Three weeks before, their old label, Decca, released the album From The Beginning, combining old hits with a number of previously unreleased recordings. It included earlier versions of songs they re-recorded for Immediate, including "My Way of Giving", which they had demoed for Chris Farlowe, and "(Tell Me) Have You Ever Seen Me?", which they had given to Apostolic Intervention. The album also featured their stage favourite "Baby Don't You Do It", featuring Jimmy Winston on lead vocals and guitar.

"Itchycoo Park", There Are But Four Small Faces and "Lazy Sunday" (1967–68) 

The band's following single "Itchycoo Park", released on 11 August 1967, was the first of the band's two charting singles in the United States, reaching No. 16 in January 1968. The single was a bigger hit in Britain, peaking at No. 3. "Itchycoo Park" was the first British single to use flanging, the technique of playing two identical master tapes simultaneously but altering the speed of one of them very slightly by touching the "flange" of one tape reel, which yielded a distinctive comb-filtering effect. The effect had been applied by Olympic Studios engineer George Chkiantz. "Itchycoo Park" was followed in December 1967 by "Tin Soldier", written by Marriott. Also, the track features American singer P. P. Arnold on backing vocals. The song was quite a hit reaching No. 9 on the UK charts and No. 73 on the U.S. Hot 100 chart. The Immediate Small Faces album was eventually released in the United States as There Are But Four Small Faces, with a considerable track change, including singles "Here Come The Nice", "Itchycoo Park", and "Tin Soldier", but eliminating several UK album tracks. The next single "Lazy Sunday", released in 1968, was an East End music-hall style song released by Immediate against the band's wishes. It was written by Marriott inspired by the feuds with his neighbours and recorded as a joke. The single reached No. 2 in the UK charts. The final official single during the band's career was folksy sounding "The Universal", released in the summer of 1968. The song was recorded by adding studio overdubs to a basic track that Marriott had cut live in his back garden in Essex with an acoustic guitar. Taped on a home cassette recorder, Marriott's recording included his dogs' barking in the background. The single's comparative lack of success in the charts (No. 16 on the UK chart) disappointed Marriott, who then stopped writing music.

Ogdens' Nut Gone Flake (1968) 

At home in England, their career reached an all-time high after the release of their classic psychedelia-influenced album Ogdens' Nut Gone Flake on 24 May 1968. It is widely regarded as a classic album, and featured an innovative round cover, the first of its kind, designed to resemble an antique tobacco tin. It stayed at No. 1 in the UK Albums Chart for six weeks, but reached only No. 159 in the US.

The two-act concept album consisted of six original songs on side one and a whimsical psychedelic fairy tale on side two relating the adventures of "Happiness Stan" and his need to find out where the other half of the moon went when it waned. It was narrated by Stanley Unwin, after original plans to have Spike Milligan narrate the album went awry when he turned them down.

Critics were enthusiastic, and the album sold well, but the band were confronted by the practical problem that they had created a studio masterpiece which was virtually impossible to recreate on the road. Ogdens was performed as a whole just once, and memorably, live in the studio on the BBC television programme Colour Me Pop.

Breakup and The Autumn Stone (1969)

Marriott officially quit the band at the end of 1968, walking off stage during a live New Year's Eve gig yelling "I quit". Citing frustration at their failure to break out of their pop image and their inability to reproduce the more sophisticated material properly on stage, Marriott was already looking ahead to a new band, Humble Pie, with Peter Frampton. On the subject of the group's breakup, Kenney Jones, in an interview with John Hellier (2001), said:

A posthumous album, The Autumn Stone, was released later in 1969, and included the major Immediate recordings, a rare live concert performance, and a number of previously unreleased tracks recorded for their intended fourth LP, 1862, including the classic Swinging Sixties instrumental "Wide Eyed Girl on the Wall" and "Donkey Rides, A Penny, A Glass", co-written by Ian McLagan. The final single, "Afterglow (Of Your Love)", was released in 1969 after the band had ceased to exist and the single only reached No. 36 in the UK Singles Charts.

Hiatus: 1970–75

 Faces (1969–75) 

After Small Faces split, Lane, Jones and McLagan joined forces with two former members of The Jeff Beck Group, singer Rod Stewart and guitarist Ronnie Wood. along with Art Wood and Kim Gardner to form Quiet Melon. Four singles were recorded before the lineup minus Art and Kim, became Faces. However, hoping to capitalize on Small Faces' earlier success, record company executives wanted the band to keep their old name. The band objected, arguing the personnel changes resulted in a group altogether different from Small Faces.

As a compromise, the new line-up's first album in the UK was credited as First Step by Faces, while in the US the same album was released as First Step by Small Faces. The album was only a mild commercial success, and the record companies perceived no further need to market this new line-up as "Small Faces". Accordingly, all subsequent albums by this incarnation of the band appeared under the new name Faces, on both sides of the Atlantic. However, all North American LP, cassette and CD reissues of First Step still credit the band as Small Faces.

Jones and McLagan stayed with the 'sequel' group Faces until their breakup in 1975. Lane exited Faces slightly earlier, in 1973. With his backing band Slim Chance, Lane then released several singles and albums from 1973–1976, including the 1974 UK hit "How Come".

 Humble Pie (1969–75) 

Marriott's first post-Small Faces venture was with the rock group Humble Pie, formed with the former Herd member Peter Frampton. Initially, the group was a huge hit in the U.S. and the UK, but Humble Pie split in 1975 due to lack of later chart success, and Marriott went solo and released an album in 1976.

Reunion: 1975–78
Following the breakup of Faces in 1975, the original Small Faces line-up reformed briefly to film videos miming to the reissued "Itchycoo Park" which hit the charts again. The group tried recording together again but Lane left after the first rehearsal due to an argument. Unknown to the others, he was just beginning to show the symptoms of multiple sclerosis, and his behaviour was misinterpreted by Marriott and the others as a drunken tantrum.

Nevertheless, McLagan, Jones and Marriott decided to stay together as Small Faces, recruiting ex-Roxy Music bassist Rick Wills to take Lane's place. This iteration of Small Faces recorded two albums: Playmates (1977) and 78 in the Shade (1978), released on Atlantic Records. Guitarist Jimmy McCulloch also briefly joined this line-up after leaving Wings. When McCulloch phoned Paul McCartney, who had found him increasingly difficult to work with, to announce he was joining Marriott, McCartney reportedly said "I was a little put out at first, but, well, what can you say to that?" McCulloch's tenure with the band lasted only for a few months in late 1977. He recorded only one album, 78 in the Shade in 1978 with the band.

The reunion albums were both critical and commercial failures. Small Faces broke up again in 1978.

Post-reunion activity: 1979–presentKenney Jones became the drummer of The Who after Keith Moon's death in 1978 and continued to work with The Who through the late 1980s. His most recent work includes a band he formed and named The Jones Gang.Ian McLagan went on to perform with artists such as Bonnie Raitt, Bob Dylan (the 1984 European Tour), The Rolling Stones, David Lindley and his band El Rayo-X among others, and more recently Billy Bragg. In 1998 he published his autobiography, All the Rage. He lived in a small town of Manor outside Austin, Texas, and was bandleader to his own "Bump Band". He died from a stroke on 3 December 2014.Steve Marriott recorded with a revived line-up of Humble Pie from 1980 to 1982. During their tour of Australia in 1982 this version of Humble Pie was sometimes billed as Small Faces in order to sell more tickets. Along with Ronnie Lane, he formed a new band called the Majik Mijits in 1981, but this band's lone album Together Again: The Lost Majik Mijits Recordings was not issued until 2000. Later in the 1980s, Marriott went solo, playing nearly 200 concerts a year. On Saturday, 20 April 1991, Steve Marriott died in his sleep when a fire, caused by a cigarette, swept through his home in Essex, England. His death came just a few days after he had begun work on a new album in the United States with his former Humble Pie bandmate, Peter Frampton.Ronnie Lane's recording career was curtailed by the effects of multiple sclerosis, though he issued collaborative albums with Pete Townshend and Ronnie Wood in the late 1970s. He moved to the United States and continued to perform live into the early 1990s. Lane died at his home in Trinidad, Colorado on 4 June 1997, after battling MS for nearly 20 years.Rick Wills of the reunited Small Faces played on David Gilmour's 1978 album, David Gilmour, then joined Foreigner later that year. He stayed with Foreigner for 14 years, until 1992. Subsequently, Wills was a member of Bad Company from 1993 to 1999 and again, briefly in 2001. Currently, he lives in Cambridge, England, and works with Kenney Jones in "The Jones Gang".Jimmy McCulloch's stint with Small Faces only lasted for a few months in late 1977. Shortly after leaving, he started a band called Wild Horses with Brian Robertson, Jimmy Bain and Kenney Jones. He and Jones both left the band before they issued any recordings. McCulloch then became a member of The Dukes, who issued one album in 1979. That same year, McCulloch died at the age of twenty-six from a heroin overdose in his flat in Maida Vale.

Honours and awards

In 1996, Small Faces were awarded the Ivor Novello Outstanding Contribution to British Music "Lifetime Achievement" award.

On 4 September 2007, a Small Faces and Don Arden commemorative plaque, issued by the London Borough of Westminster, was unveiled in their memory in Carnaby Street. Kenney Jones, who attended the ceremony, said in a BBC television interview, "To honour Small Faces after all these years is a terrific achievement. I only wish that Steve Marriott, Ronnie Lane and the late Don Arden were here to enjoy this moment with me".

On 7 December 2011, Small Faces were announced as 2012 inductees into the Rock and Roll Hall of Fame. The induction ceremony was held on 14 April 2012.

Band membersClassic line-up :
Steve Marriott – vocals, guitar, harmonica, keyboards (1965–1968, 1975–1978; died 1991)
Ronnie Lane – bass guitar, vocals, guitar (1965–1969, 1975; died 1997)
Ian McLagan – keyboards, vocals, guitar, bass (1965–1969, 1975–1978; died 2014)
Kenney Jones – drums, percussion, vocals (1965–1969, 1975–1978)

 Discography Studio albumsSmall Faces (1966)
Small Faces (1967) / There Are But Four Small Faces (US only, 1968)
Ogdens' Nut Gone Flake (1968)
Playmates (1977)
78 in the Shade (1978)

ReferencesGeneral 
 
 
 
 Specific'

External links

Small Faces The Darlings Of Wapping Wharf Launderette
Small Faces on Wapping Wharf
Small Faces on Making Time
The Small Fakers (Tribute Band)
Steve Marriott and the Moments on Making Time

 
English rock music groups
Musical groups from London
Musical groups established in 1965
Musical groups disestablished in 1978
Musical quartets
British Invasion artists
Ivor Novello Award winners
Atlantic Records artists
RCA Victor artists
Charly Records artists
Decca Records artists
Immediate Records artists
British rhythm and blues boom musicians
Psychedelic pop music groups
1965 establishments in England
1978 disestablishments in England